Stanislav Danko (born 17 March 1994) is a Slovak professional footballer who plays as a midfielder for FK Slavoj Trebišov.

Honours
Danko won the 2014–15 DOXXbet liga with the Zemplín Michalovce.

Personal life
Danko was born in Pozdišovce in Slovakia.

References

External links
 MFK Zemplín Michalovce official profile
 Futbalnet profile
 Eurofotbal profile
 

1994 births
Living people
People from Michalovce
Sportspeople from the Košice Region
Slovak footballers
Slovakia youth international footballers
Association football midfielders
MFK Zemplín Michalovce players
ŠKF Sereď players
FK Slavoj Trebišov players
2. Liga (Slovakia) players
Slovak Super Liga players